The 1996 Rhode Island Rams football team was an American football team that represented the University of Rhode Island in the Yankee Conference during the 1996 NCAA Division I-AA football season. In their fourth season under head coach Floyd Keith, the Rams compiled a 4–6 record (2–5 against conference opponents) and finished fourth in the New England Division of the Yankee Conference.

Schedule

References

Rhode Island
Rhode Island Rams football seasons
Rhode Island Rams football